Holy Family Church, or other variations on the name, may refer to:

Canada
Holy Family Roman Catholic Church (Parkdale, Toronto), Ontario)
Holy Family Cathedral (Saskatoon), Saskatchewan

Finland
Holy Family of Nazareth Church, Oulu

India
Holy Family Syro-Malabar Church, Mannila
Holy Family Catholic Church (Srinagar)

Israel
Church of the Holy Family, Jerusalem

Italy
Church of the Holy Family (Alcamo)

Kenya
Cathedral Basilica of the Holy Family, Nairobi

Palestine
Holy Family Church, Gaza
Holy Family Church, Ramallah

Russia
Church of the Holy Family, Kaliningrad

Singapore
Church of the Holy Family, Singapore, a Roman Catholic parish

Slovakia
Holy Family Church, Bratislava

Spain
Sagrada Família, the Expiatory Temple of the Holy Family, a massive church in Barcelona

United Kingdom
Church of the Holy Family, Dunblane, Scotland

United States

California
Church of the Holy Family (Agoura Hills, California)
Holy Family Catholic Church (Glendale, California)
Holy Family Catholic Church (Orange, California)

Connecticut
Holy Family Church (Fairfield, Connecticut)

Georgia
Church of the Holy Family (Columbus, Georgia), listed on the NRHP in Georgia

Illinois
Holy Family Catholic Church (Chicago), Illinois
Church of the Holy Family (Cahokia Heights, Illinois), listed on the NRHP in Illinois
Holy Family Church (North Chicago, Illinois), listed on the NRHP in Illinois

Iowa
 Holy Family Catholic Church (Fort Madison, Iowa)

Minnesota
Church of the Holy Family (Eveleth, Minnesota), listed on the NRHP in Minnesota

Mississippi
Holy Family Catholic Church Historic District, Natchez, Mississippi, listed on the NRHP in Mississippi

Montana
Holy Family Mission (Glacier County, Montana), Browning, Montana, listed on the NRHP in Montana

Nebraska
Holy Family Catholic Church (Omaha, Nebraska), listed on the NRHP in Nebraska
Holy Family Church (Omaha, Nebraska), listed on the NRHP in Nebraska

New York
Church of the Holy Family (New Rochelle, New York)

Ohio
Holy Family Catholic Church (Frenchtown, Ohio), listed on the NRHP in Ohio

Pennsylvania
Holy Family Catholic Church (Philadelphia), in the Roxborough section of Philadelphia
Holy Family Church (Pittsburgh)

South Dakota
Holy Family Church, School, and Rectory, Mitchell, South Dakota, listed on the NRHP in South Dakota

Washington, D.C.
Ukrainian Catholic National Shrine of the Holy Family

See also
Family Church (disambiguation)
Holy Family (disambiguation)
Holy Family Cathedral (disambiguation)